Mzuzu is the capital of Malawi's Northern Region and is the third largest city by population in Malawi. The city has 221,272 residents and 20,000 commuters (Mzuzu University students) with about 1.7 million people in its metropolitan area. It is situated in Mzimba District. Mzuzu lies in a gap in the Viphya Mountains, and the agricultural region surrounding the city specializes in tea, rubber and coffee cultivation. The Viphya Plantation south of the city is the largest man-made forest in Africa, and the Lunyangwa and Kaning'ina forest preserves are east of the city.

Some of the popularly known locations in the city include Chibavi, Luwinga, Area 1B, Chibanja, Katoto, Zolozolo, Masasa, Mchenga-utuba, Chimaliro, Kaning'ina and Katawa.

Demographics

Ethnic Groups

According to the 2018 census, the Tumbuka people are the largest ethnic group in the city composing 51.71% of the city's population. The largest minority ethnic group are the Chewa making up 13.51% of the population. Other minor ethnic groups include the Ngoni with 8.09% of the population, Tonga with 7.36%, Nkhonde with 4.08%, Lambya with 3.75%, Yao with 3.59%, Lomwe with 3.54%, Sukwa with 1.07%, Sena with 0.66%, Mang'anja with 0.38%, Nyanja with 0.28%, and other ethnic groups with 2% of the population.

Religion

The largest religious denomination in Mzuzu is Church of Central Africa Presbyterian with 28.01%. The largest minority religion is Catholicism with 17.28%. Other minor religions include Seventh-day Adventist, Baptist, and Apostolic with 16.27% combined, Pentecostal with 6.62%, Anglican with 1.58%, other Christian denominations with 22.21%, Islam with 4.06%, Traditional with 0.1%, other religions with 3.59%, and no religion with 0.28% of the city.

The city was developed around the Commonwealth Development Corporation's Tung Oil Estate in 1947 and received city status in 1985. The name comes from a mispronunciation of the word 'Vizuzu' by the white settlers. Vizuzu are plants that grow along the Lunyangwa river. These plants were spotted near the present Mzuzu Government Secondary School also known as Area 1A where the tung planters settled.

Culture
The culture of the city is an amalgam of other cultures of the northern region. Tumbuka is widely spoken in Mzuzu but other languages such as Chewa, Tonga, Swahili, Ngonde are also spoken. The city has a museum (first opened in 1986) where different artifacts depicting the cultures of the north are on display. Popular foods include  (either made from maize, locally called , or made from cassava, locally called ), rice, locally called , and  fish (a bottle-nosed mormyrid, Mormyrus longirostris). Batala comes from the nearby Lake Malawi waters in Nkhata Bay. Other common foods include: maize, bananas, plantains, cocoa, cassava and sweet potatoes.

Health
Mzuzu City is home to Mzuzu Central Hospital, one of four such hospitals in the country. The city is also serviced by Mapale Health Center located at the city centre next to the city's main shopping mall, Shoprite. There are also several CHAM hospitals such as St. Johns, St. John of God Mental Hospital, Nkhorongo SDA Clinic. The city also has private clinics like: Katoto MASM MEDI Clinic, Mumbwe, Kandindindi Evergreen. The pharmaceutical manufacturing company Kentam Products Limited is based in Mzuzu.

Climate

Economy and infrastructure
The commercial hub of the region has coffee, timber, fruit, milk and honey production. Manufacturing includes medication, cosmetics and timber. Through Mzuzu University, the city has a highly skilled labor force. Mzuzu also has good arable land, but is still developing its electricity industry towards a sufficient and reliable state. There is good capital mobility through new banking facilities. There are also small to medium-sized businesses located there that provide telecommunication services, internet cafes, and multipurpose stores. National chains like Chipiku, Peoples Trading, and A.C opticals can be found. The city is the home base of national companies Mzuzu Coffee, Kentam Products Limited, Mzupaso Paints Limited and Northern Life magazine. Mzuzu has two major markets, including Taifa Market that sells fruits, clothes, cellphones, shoes and other products.

Education
The city is home to Mzuzu University, founded in 1999. The university has five faculties namely: Tourism and Hospitality Management, Education, Health Sciences, Environmental Sciences and Information and Library Science. Mzuzu Technical College, which was founded in 1958 by the White Fathers, is located in Mzuzu. It is home to leading high schools in the north, including Marymount Secondary School, Wukani private Secondary School, Katoto Government Secondary School, Zolozolo Community Day Secondary School Viphya Schools and Mzuzu Academy.

The city also has several primary schools such as Wukani, Trust Academy, Wongani private primary school [run by MIC Catholic Sisters], Beehive and Hilltop schools.

Environment
Mzuzu is situated in wooded, hilly terrain. Miombo woodland predominates around the city. North and south of the city, the Viphya Mountains are home to montane grasslands and forests. The Viphya Plantation in the mountains south of the city is claimed to be the largest man-made forest in Africa.

The weather in Mzuzu is chilly in the cold season.

Agriculture
In the center of an agricultural region, and the area surrounding the city specializes in tea, rubber, and coffee cultivation.

Tourism

Nearby tourist attractions include the sandy beaches of Lake Malawi and water activities. Nyika National Park, Malawi's largest park, offers hiking, mountain biking, horse riding safaris and 4x4 excursions. The entertainment venues at Mzuzu hotel and O Seasons formerly known as Key Lounge attract national and international artists and host other activities that popular with both tourists and the local community. Other entertainment venues include Mzuzu Golf Clib, Villa Kagwentha (known for discos every Saturday nights) and the newly opened Squirrels park. There are also various recreation centers such as Lake View Lodge and the Mzuzu Sanctuary. Mzuzu Botanic Gardens is located Zolozolo. Mountain hiking can take place at the nearby Kaning'ina mountains. Gulliver Dam, which supplies water to Mzuzu City and the surrounding areas, offers hiking as well

The 1st Poulner Scout Group (UK) has set up a Scout Campsite with significant infrastructure just outside of Mzuzu called the Kavuzi Campsite.

Transport
By air Mzuzu City is served by the Mzuzu Airport. In 2017, construction began on a new and bigger airport by the government in the Dunduzu area.

Mzuzu is on Malawi's M1 Highway, which runs the length of the country from north to south. It is the northern terminus of the M5 highway, which runs eastwards through a gap in the Viphya Mountains towards Nkhata Bay, and then south along the shore of Lake Malawi.

Sports 
Football is popular sport in Mzuzu. Two teams, Moyale Barracks FC and Mzuni represent the city in the Malawi's top flight league. Mzuzu Stadium (15000 capacity) is the city's sole stadium built around 1970 using prison labor. The City has two major basketball teams, Nkhulande and the Pistons.

Notable Residents
Shepherd Bushiri, founder of the Enlightened Christian Gathering, is from Mzuzu. Bushiri is also the founder of PSB Network and the Prophetic Channel.

References

External links

 
Populated places in Northern Region, Malawi